Roccapiemonte is a town and comune in the province of Salerno in the Campania region of south-western Italy.

Geography
Located in the east of the Agro Nocerino Sarnese, it borders with the towns of Castel San Giorgio, Cava de' Tirreni, Mercato San Severino, Nocera Inferiore and Nocera Superiore. The hamlets (frazioni) are Casali and San Potito.

Demography

References

External links

 Roccapiemonte official website

Cities and towns in Campania